Piotr Wawryniuk (born 29 June 1943) is a Polish equestrian. He competed at the 1968 Summer Olympics and the 1972 Summer Olympics.

References

1943 births
Living people
Polish male equestrians
Olympic equestrians of Poland
Equestrians at the 1968 Summer Olympics
Equestrians at the 1972 Summer Olympics
People from Biała Podlaska County